Orchestomerus is a genus of minute seed weevils in the family of beetles known as Curculionidae. There are about 14 described species in Orchestomerus.

Species
These 14 species belong to the genus Orchestomerus:

 Orchestomerus bicarinatus Colonnelli, 1991 c
 Orchestomerus chiriquensis Colonnelli, 1991 c
 Orchestomerus eisemani b
 Orchestomerus gibbicollis Colonnelli, 1991 c
 Orchestomerus marionis b
 Orchestomerus modestus Colonnelli, 1991 c
 Orchestomerus nodicollis Colonnelli, 1994 c
 Orchestomerus phytobioides Colonnelli, 1991 c
 Orchestomerus pleurostigma Colonnelli, 1991 c
 Orchestomerus subsultans Colonnelli, 1994 c
 Orchestomerus suturalis Colonnelli, 1991 c
 Orchestomerus ulkei Dietz, 1896 c
 Orchestomerus whiteheadi Colonnelli, 1991 c b
 Orchestomerus wickhami b

Data sources: i = ITIS, c = Catalogue of Life, g = GBIF, b = Bugguide.net

References

Further reading

External links

 

Curculionidae